The 2012–13 Euroleague qualifying rounds were the qualifying rounds for the 2012–13 Euroleague. Eight teams was participating in a single-venue tournament format. The winner, Mapooro Cantù, advanced to the Euroleague Regular Season.
The qualifying round was played between September 25 and 28 at the PalaDesio in Desio, Italy.

Teams

Bracket

First qualifying round

Second qualifying round

Third qualifying round

References 

2012–13 Euroleague